Wang Jiang (died 10th century BC) was the queen consort of King Kang of Zhou.

She handled the economic affairs of the imperial family, accompanied the king on military campaigns and rewarded officials on his request.

References 

11th-century BC births
10th-century BC deaths
10th-century BC Chinese women
10th-century BC Chinese people
Zhou dynasty consorts